West Canaveral Groves is a census-designated place (CDP) in Brevard County, Florida, United States.

The community was first listed as a CDP prior to the 2020 census.

Demographics

References 

Census-designated places in Brevard County, Florida
Census-designated places in Florida